Sheri-An Davis is an English actress.

Career
Davis made her acting debut as Roz, a friend of Siobhan, on After You've Gone.  She also guest stars on “Coming Up” and “My Family”.  She appears as a recurring character, Nurse Delia, on the hit teen drama House of Anubis in 2011.

Filmography

External links
 

Living people
English television actresses
Year of birth missing (living people)